Julesburg is the statutory town that is the county seat and the most populous municipality of Sedgwick County, Colorado, United States.   The population was 1,225 at the 2010 United States Census.
It is close to the Nebraska border.

History
The original trading post was named for Jules Beni.  Julesburg was on the Pony Express (1860–1861) route from Missouri to California.

Jack Slade

In 1858, Joseph A. "Jack" Slade, a superintendent for the Central Overland California and Pikes Peak Express Company, was tracking down horse thieves, including Jules Beni. Slade caught up with him at Julesburg, but Beni shot him five times. Everybody thought that Slade was dead and several angry townsfolk chased Beni out of Julesburg. When they returned, they found Slade struggling to his feet, having miraculously recovered.

Beni continued to steal horses from the Pike's Peak Express Company, and Slade vowed to hunt him down. Beni attempted to ambush Slade at Slade's own ranch at Cold Springs. But Slade found out about the planned ambush and, along with some of his cowboys, captured Beni. Slade did not take Beni to authorities but instead shot him dead while he was tied to a fence post.  He shot off each of his fingers, and then put the gun in Beni's mouth and pulled the trigger.  Afterward, he severed Beni's ears as trophies. 

This account is among the Stories of the Century, a syndicated television series starring and narrated by Jim Davis, which aired on March 4, 1955. Gregg Palmer (1927-2015) played the role of Slade, and Paul Newlan (1903–1973) portrayed Beni.

Battle of Julesburg

Julesburg was a large and prominent stagecoach station and the site of Fort Rankin (later Fort Sedgwick).  In revenge for the Sand Creek Massacre, one thousand Cheyenne, Arapaho, and Lakota warriors attacked Julesburg on January 7, 1865.  In the battle the Indians defeated about 60 soldiers of the U.S. army and 50 armed civilians.  In the following weeks the Indians raided up and down the South Platte River valley. On February 2 they returned to Julesburg and burned down all the buildings in the settlement, although not attacking the soldiers and civilians holed up in the fort. At the time, the town was said to have had over 1000 buildings.

Geography
Julesburg is located at  (40.988422, −102.266677).

The town is located on the north side of the South Platte River, along U.S. 138 and U.S. 385 and just off of I-76.

Climate
Julesburg experiences a semi-arid climate (Köppen BSk) with cold, dry winters and hot, wetter summers.

Demographics

As of the census of 2000, there were 1,467 people, 613 households, and 407 families residing in the town. The racial makeup of the town was 89.03% White, 0.20% African American, 0.07% Native American, 0.41% Asian, 0.14% Pacific Islander, 7.77% from other races, and 2.39% from two or more races. Hispanic or Latino of any race were 14.18% of the population.

There were 613 households, out of which 28.2% had children under the age of 18 living with them, 54.8% were married couples living together, 7.3% had a female householder with no husband present, and 33.6% were non-families. 31.2% of all households were made up of individuals, and 14.2% had someone living alone who was 65 years of age or older.  The average household size was 2.30 and the average family size was 2.86.

In the town, the population was spread out, with 23.4% under the age of 18, 7.2% from 18 to 24, 23.9% from 25 to 44, 21.2% from 45 to 64, and 24.4% who were 65 years of age or older.  The median age was 42 years. For every 100 females, there were 90.3 males.  For every 100 females age 18 and over, there were 90.5 males.

The median income for a household in the town was $28,207, and the median income for a family was $34,500. Males had a median income of $27,337 versus $17,125 for females. The per capita income for the town was $14,913.  About 8.1% of families and 10.2% of the population were below the poverty line, including 14.1% of those under age 18 and 5.0% of those age 65 or over.

Education
Julesburg School District operates public schools.

In media
Julesburg was featured in the 1960 episode "The Story of Julesburg" of the syndicated television series Pony Express.  It was the setting of the 1959 Randolph Scott film, Westbound.  "Julesburg" is the title of the second episode (1955) of the ABC western Cheyenne.  A 2019 YouTube video by VOA News features Julesburg as the backdrop for a short documentary about Charmaine Teodoro, a math teacher from the Philippines who is currently working at Julesburg High School.

See also

Outline of Colorado
Index of Colorado-related articles
State of Colorado
Colorado cities and towns
Colorado municipalities
Colorado counties
Sedgwick County, Colorado
Pony Express National Historic Trail

References

External links

Town of Julesburg
Map of Julesburg, CDOT

Towns in Colorado
Towns in Sedgwick County, Colorado
County seats in Colorado
Pony Express stations
Overland Trail
Stagecoach stops in the United States